The port of Ventspils is an Ice-free, deep-water sea port located in Ventspils on Latvia's Baltic coast. Its total area is 2451.39 hectares. By cargo turnover it is one of the Baltic Sea's busiest ports.

The port of Ventspils became a multimodal port when the harbour was significantly deepened in 1998, reaching a maximum depth of 17.5 meters in the liquid bulk area. This allowed the accommodation of the largest vessels then operating in the Baltic Sea, including Aframax-size tankers with maximum 130.000 metric tons deadweight (DWT). The dry bulk and general cargo area, with a depth of 16 meters, allows the terminal to accommodate Panamax-type vessels with their load capacities of up to 75.000 DWT.

Cargo turnover of Ventspils port (Latvia) for 5 months in 2016 was decreased on 23% - to 9 million tons. Including 5 months of 2016, the volume of transshipment through the terminal Ventspils Nafta termināls decreased by 27%, via Baltic Coal Terminal fell by 45% to 609 thousand tonnes, through the "Ventspils commercial sea port decreased by 32%, through the terminal Ventamonjaks decreased by 50% to 26 thousand tonnes through the terminal Ventall Termināls was reduced by 60%. Cargo turnover of the terminal Ventbunkers decreased by 3%.

The Freeport of Ventspils 
Ventspils port is managed by the Freeport of Ventspils, which is supervised by the Cabinet of Ministers of the Republic of Latvia, under various statutory authorities. These include the 1994 Law on ports (regarding  operations and procedures), the 1997 Ventspils Freeport Law (which provides for businesses within the port), and the 2002 Law on Tax Application in Free Ports and Special Economic Zones, which regulates tax incentives for those businesses within the port.

Infrastructure 
Ventspils is on the East-West railway corridor and part of the Eurasian transport system, as well as European motorway route E22. Ventspils Airport is close by, and Riga International Airport (RIX) is approximately two hours' drive away.

References

External links 
 http://www.portofventspils.lv/

Ventspils
Ventspils
Ventspils